Cleo Joel James (born August 31, 1940) is an American former professional baseball outfielder. He played in Major League Baseball (MLB) with the Los Angeles Dodgers in 1968 and for the Chicago Cubs between 1970 and 1973.

A baseball and football star at Riverside, California Junior College (now Riverside City College), James decided on professional baseball. After playing briefly with the Dodgers in 1968, he returned to the minor leagues and made the Pacific Coast League All-Star team in 1969, and finished third in the league in batting average.

The Cubs acquired him in December 1969 draft through the Rule 5 draft, which allows major league teams to draft players from other organizations' minor league teams.

In the 1970 Chicago Cubs season, James played in 100 games as a rookie. Early in the season, he frequently was used as a defensive replacement in center field in late innings. By June he was the Cubs' starting centerfielder, but lost his position when the team acquired Joe Pepitone in July. On Sept. 3, James started in left field in place of Billy Williams, ending Williams' then National League record 1,117 consecutive games played streak.

External links
, or Retrosheet
Venezuelan Professional Baseball League statistics

1940 births
Living people
African-American baseball players
Águilas del Zulia players
Albuquerque Dodgers players
American expatriate baseball players in Mexico
Arizona Instructional League Dodgers players
Baseball players from Mississippi
Cardenales de Lara players
Chicago Cubs players
Leones del Caracas players
American expatriate baseball players in Venezuela
Llaneros de Acarigua players
Los Angeles Dodgers players
Major League Baseball outfielders
Pericos de Puebla players
Santa Barbara Rancheros players
St. Petersburg Saints players
Salem Dodgers players
Spokane Indians players
Sportspeople from Clarksdale, Mississippi
Tacoma Cubs players
Wichita Aeros players
21st-century African-American people
20th-century African-American sportspeople